Mahananda may refer to:

Films:
Mahananda (film), a Bengali film directed by Arindam Sil 
Mahananda (2001 film), by Manik Das
Mahananda (1984 film), a Marathi film
Mahananda (1939 film), a Telugu film directed by China Kameswara Rao Dronamraju
Sati Mahananda, a 1933 Hindi film

Places:
Mahananda River, a tributary of the Ganges
Mahananda Wildlife Sanctuary, a protected wildlife sanctuary in West Bengal

Other uses:
Mahananda Express, a train which runs between New Delhi and Alipurduar, in India
Mahananda Sapkota, a Nepalese social worker
Mahananda (company), a state-backed cooperative that is the largest supplier of milk in the Indian state of Maharashtra